The Breeders 3yo Colt & Gelding Trot is a harness racing event for Standardbred trotters. It is one part of an annual Breeders Crown series of twelve races for both Standardbred trotters and Pacers. First run in 1985, it is contested over a distance of one mile. Race organizers have awarded the event to various racetracks across North America. The 2017 race will be held at Hoosier Park in Anderson, Indiana, United States.

Historical race events
In 2010, Pocono Downs became the first venue to host all 12 events on a single night.

North American Locations
Woodbine Racetrack (Wdb) Ontario (10)
Pompano Park (Ppk) Florida (7)
Meadowlands Racetrack (Mxx) New Jersey (6)
Mohawk Raceway (Moh) Ontario (4)
Pocono Downs (Pcd) Pennsylvania (2)
Colonial Downs (Cln) Virginia (1) 
Garden State Park (Gsp) New Jersey (1)
The Meadows Racetrack (Mea) Pennsylvania (1)
Vernon Downs (Vdx) New York (1)

Records
 Most wins by a driver
 5 – Brian Sears (2004, 2005, 2007, 2009, 2010)

 Most wins by a trainer
 6 – Charles Sylvester (1987, 1993, 1994, 1996, 1998, 2013) & Jimmy Takter (1997, 2002, 2008, 2014, 2015, 2016)

 Stakes record
 1:51 4/5 – Father Patrick (2014) & Bar Hopping (2015)

Winners of the Breeders Crown 3YO Colt & Gelding Trot

References

Recurring sporting events established in 1984
Harness racing in the United States
Harness racing in Canada
Breeders Crown
Racing series for horses
Horse races in Florida
Horse races in New Jersey
Horse races in New York (state)
Horse races in Ontario
Horse races in Pennsylvania
Horse races in Virginia